The Niagara Falls Museum was founded by Thomas Barnett, an Englishman from Birmingham in 1827. It is best known as the oldest Canadian museum and for having housed the mummy of Ramesses I for 140 years before its return to Egypt in 2003. The building has undergone several vocational changes and building refurbishments in its history.

History 

Thomas Barnett was born on December 4, 1799, near Birmingham, England. He moved to Canada in the early 1820s and opened the Niagara Falls Museum in 1827 at the base of the Canadian Horseshoe Falls. Barnett had a passion for collecting oddities. He retrofitted a former brewery house to exhibit his private collection. Although Barnett was aware of the collection patterns of his North American contemporaries, his own approach bore an uncanny similarity to the British tradition, such as the Ashmolean Museum in Oxford, the first traditional museum in Britain.

The Niagara Falls Museum had humble beginnings. In 1827, the first museum contained Thomas Barnett's own cabinet of taxidermic curiosities. Although the details were not documented, the collection was likely composed of a number of mounted animals of local origin, combined with a smattering of Native Canadian artifacts. Barnett's collection however rapidly grew. Prior to 1844, an account of the museum's contents stated that there were over 5000 items, including bipeds, quadrupeds, birds, fish, insects, reptiles, shells, minerals, and Native American curiosities. Through the first fifty years of its existence, the Niagara Falls Museum continued to acquire similar artifacts through the diligent efforts of the Barnett family and their associates.

In 1854, Sydney Barnett (son of Thomas Barnett) made the first of his three trips to Egypt (two by himself and one with Dr. J. Douglas of Montreal) and purchased four mummies as well as a host of other Egyptian antiquities. In 1857, mastodon remains were discovered in St. Thomas, Ontario and later placed in the museum. In 1859, an inventory of the museum's contents included, in addition to the previously mentioned artifacts, an egg collection, ancient and modern coins, Japanese and Chinese relics. In 1873, the Barnetts purchased the remains of a large whale, the 40-foot magnificent humpback whale skeleton. Barnett and his son Sydney, who assisted with the museum, were both accomplished taxidermists, preparing specimens for the museum as well as traded and sold to other institutions. Sydney Barnett, an army Colonel, was also a poet, writer, and inventor. With the growing popular fascination with the "Wild West," Sydney Barnett began organizing a Wild West Show and Grand Buffalo Hunt in 1872. He originally contacted "Buffalo Bill" Cody to feature lasso men and gathered over 100 Pottawatomie Indians for a large buffalo hunt. Problems arose when the US Government would not allow the Indians off the reservation. The show was then changed to feature General Custer's scout "Wild Bill" Hickok as master of ceremonies, assisted by local Woodland Indians of the Tuscarora and Cayuga Nations.

Following the transfer of ownership in 1878 to the Davis family, after an acrimonious decades-long rivalry with Buffalo's Saul Davis, the museum nevertheless survived. In 1882, the Niagara Parks Commission was formed to convert the front to the present Queen Victoria Park. This forced the museum to be relocated. In 1888, no suitable location could be found in Canada so it was relocated to Niagara Falls, New York. The Davis family established an Art Gallery in the museum in 1891. During the early years of their proprietorship, five more Egyptian mummies were purchased, along with the entire collection from the celebrated Wood's Museum of Chicago. While acquiring a few new exhibits, others were lost or disposed of over time. There were documented exchanges also, of artifacts and specimens between the Niagara Falls Museum and P.T. Barnum.

In 1892, the museum's living display came to an end because of complaints from area residents about the noises and the odors. A number of artifacts displayed in Buffalo at the Pan-American Exposition of 1901 had been acquired by the Niagara Falls Museum. A giant Sequoia tree that was reportedly felled on the Eel River, Humboldt County, California, on February 14, 1893, was a highlight in the Forestry Building at the exposition. Its circumference was seventy-seven feet, making it one of the largest trees ever cut down in the world. Also given to the museum was a shell and coral collection gathered by Louis Agassiz of Harvard University. The exposition contained a wealth of artifacts, and although only the above artifacts have been documented there may be items in the museum's Eskimo, Oriental and South Sea Island display originating from the exposition.

Thomas Barnett died in 1890 in Niagara Falls, Canada. He leaves behind a legacy as the founder of Canada's oldest museum and Canada's first "Museum Man." The museum collection was owned by the Sherman family until May 1999 when the entire collection was purchased by private collector, William Jamieson of Toronto, whose hope was to revive the tradition Thomas Barnett started.

People associated with the museum
Thomas Barnett was the original founder of the Niagara Falls Museum. He housed his collection of taxidermy and curiosities in a former brewery in Niagara Falls, Ontario before erecting a building at the base of the Canadian Horseshoe Falls.

Sydney Barnett was the founder's son who purchased and brought back from Egypt some of the mummies the museum is now famous for returning to Dr. Zahi Hawass of Egypt's Supreme Council of Antiquities. An avid taxidermist like his father, he organized some of the museum's public events including the Wild West themed attractions.

Dr. J. Douglas of Montreal accompanied Sydney Barnett to Egypt.

Saul Davis purchased the museum in 1878 and introduced an art gallery. The museum was then moved to the American side of the Niagara Falls. It did however move back to the Canadian side when the US parks authority assumed possession of the land on which the museum stood.

In Canada, Sherman family sold the museum's collection in 1999 to a Canadian collector, William Jamieson (died July 3, 2011) a dealer of tribal art with an impressive collection of shrunken heads, among other curiosities.

The Niagara Falls History Museum acquired part of the Niagara Falls Museum collection in 2014 which included Barnett's beloved two-legged dog Skipper.

Identification of Ramesses I
In 1999, Jamieson sold the Egyptian artifacts in the museum's collection, including some mummies, to the Michael C. Carlos Museum at Emory University in Atlanta, Georgia.  These included an unidentified male mummy.  Through research and collaboration with medical experts at Emory University School of Medicine, museum scholars were able to identify the mummy as Pharaoh Ramesses I.  The museum returned the mummy to Egypt in 2003 as a gift of goodwill and international cultural cooperation whereupon it was placed in its own museum after having been missing for over 150 years, 140 years of which it had been in Niagara Falls, Canada, unknown to anyone.

See also
 Niagara Falls History Museum

References

 

1827 establishments in Canada
Museums disestablished in 1999
Defunct museums in Canada
Museums in Niagara Falls, Ontario
Natural history museums in Canada
Museums established in 1827